Jeremy Deshawn Evans (born October 24, 1987) is an American professional basketball player for Paris Basketball of the LNB Pro A. He played college basketball for the Western Kentucky Hilltoppers before being drafted by the Utah Jazz in 2010. During his career, Evans has spent time with the Utah Jazz, the Dallas Mavericks, the Atlanta Hawks, and Khimki Moscow in Russia. In 2012, he was named the NBA Slam Dunk Contest champion.

High school career
Evans attended Crossett High School, where he helped the Eagles reach the state tournament each of his last two seasons. As a junior, he was named All-State, All-League, and was voted the County Player of the Year after Crossett High finished 17–10. As a senior, he averaged 25.6 points, 11.0 rebounds, and 4.0 blocks per game, earning All-State and All-Conference accolades.

College career
Evans played in college for the Western Kentucky Hilltoppers. As a senior, he averaged 10.0 ppg with a field goal percentage of .639. He is the Hilltoppers all-time leader in blocks with 224 and also a member of WKU's 1,000-point club with 1,065 career points, and he wrapped up his career with a 7.9 point-per game scoring average and an average of 5.9 rebounds per game.

Professional career

Utah Jazz (2010–2015)

Evans was drafted by the Utah Jazz with the 55th overall pick in the 2010 NBA draft. On March 4, 2011, he was assigned to the Utah Flash. He was recalled on March 6.

On February 22, 2012, Evans was announced as a competitor in the 2012 Sprite NBA All-Star Weekend Slam Dunk Contest, replacing the injured Iman Shumpert of the New York Knicks. He dunked two basketballs in one dunk over teammate Gordon Hayward and won the contest with 29% of the votes.

On July 11, 2012, Evans re-signed with the Utah Jazz to a multi-year deal.

On February 16, 2013, Evans participated in another Slam Dunk Contest. In one of his dunks, he jumped over a painting of himself dunking, which he himself painted. He went on to lose to Terrence Ross.

Dallas Mavericks (2015–2016)
On July 31, 2015, Evans signed a two-year deal with the Dallas Mavericks. He made his debut for the Mavericks in the team's season opener against the Phoenix Suns on October 28, recording 7 points and 6 rebounds in a 111–95 win. During his first year as a member of Mavericks, he had multiple assignments to the Texas Legends of the NBA Development League. On March 17, 2016, he was ruled out for the rest of the season after undergoing arthroscopic surgery to repair a torn labrum in his right shoulder.

On July 7, 2016, Evans was traded, along with cash considerations and the rights to Emir Preldžić, to the Indiana Pacers in exchange for the rights to Stanko Barać. On October 23, 2016, he was waived by the Pacers after appearing in two preseason games.

Khimki (2016–2017)
On October 29, 2016, Evans signed with Russian club BC Khimki for the rest of the 2016–17 season.

Erie BayHawks (2017–2018)
On September 21, 2017, Evans signed with the Atlanta Hawks. He was released on October 13 as one of the team’s final preseason roster cuts.

Atlanta Hawks (2018)
On April 1, 2018, the Atlanta Hawks announced that they had signed Evans to a 10-day contract.

Darüşşafaka (2018–2019)
On August 21, 2018, Evans signed a one-year deal with Darüşşafaka of the Turkish BSL and the EuroLeague.

Second stint with Khimki (2019–2020)
On July 25, 2019, Khimki announced that they had brought back Evans.

Olimpia Milano (2021)
On February 24, 2021, Evans signed with Olimpia Milano, competing only in EuroLeague games. He parted ways with the team on May 31.

Panathinaikos (2021–2022)
On August 21, 2021, Evans signed with Panathinaikos of the Greek Basket League and the EuroLeague, penning a one-year deal. In 28 Greek Basket League games, he averaged 6.8 points, 4.3 rebounds and 0.7 blocks, playing around 17 minutes per contest. Additionally, in 32 EuroLeague games, he averaged 5.5 points, 3 rebounds and 0.5 blocks, playing around 16 minutes per contest.

Paris Basketball (2022–present)
On October 18, 2022, he has signed with Paris Basketball of the LNB Pro A.

The Basketball Tournament 
In 2017, Evans played for the Kentucky Kings of The Basketball Tournament. Evans averaged 21.5 PPG and 13.0 RPG to help his team advance to the second round of the tournament. The Basketball Tournament is an annual $2 million winner-take-all tournament broadcast on ESPN. In TBT 2018, he played for Eberlein Drive. Eberlein Drive made it to the championship game, where they lost to Overseas Elite.

Career statistics

NBA

Regular season

|-
| style="text-align:left;"| 
| style="text-align:left;"| Utah
| 49 || 3 || 9.4 || .661 || .000 || .703 || 2.0 || .5 || .3 || .3 || 3.6
|-
| style="text-align:left;"| 
| style="text-align:left;"| Utah
| 29 || 0 || 7.5 || .643 || .000 || .500 || 1.7 || .4 || .2 || .8 || 2.1
|-
| style="text-align:left;"| 
| style="text-align:left;"| Utah
| 37 || 0 || 5.8 || .614 || .000 || .636 || 1.6 || .3 || .2 || .4 || 2.0
|-
| style="text-align:left;"| 
| style="text-align:left;"| Utah
| 66 || 4 || 18.3 || .527 || .000 || .680 || 4.7 || .7 || .6 || .7 || 6.1
|-
| style="text-align:left;"| 
| style="text-align:left;"| Utah
| 38 || 0 || 7.0 || .552 || .400 || .828 || 1.9 || .3 || .3 || .3 || 2.4
|-
| style="text-align:left;"| 
| style="text-align:left;"| Dallas
| 30 || 2 || 8.4 || .542 || .250 || .714 || 1.8 || .1 || .2 || .3 || 2.4
|-
| style="text-align:left;"|
| style="text-align:left;"| Atlanta
| 1 || 0 || 5.0 || 1.000 || – || – || 1.0 || .0 || .0 || .0 || 2.0
|- class="sortbottom"
| style="text-align:center;" colspan="2"| Career
| 250 || 9 || 10.5 || .569 || .231 || .687 || 2.6 || .4 || .4 || .5 || 3.5

Playoffs

|-
|style="text-align:left;"|2012
|style="text-align:left;"|Utah
| 2 || 0 || 3.5 || .000 || – || 1.000 || 1.5 || .5 || .5 || .0 || 1.0
|- class="sortbottom"
| style="text-align:center;" colspan="2"| Career
| 2 || 0 || 3.5 || .000 || – || 1.000 || 1.5 || .5 || .5 || .0 || 1.0

EuroLeague 

|-
| style="text-align:left;"| 2018–19
| style="text-align:left;"| Darüşşafaka
| 27 || 25 || 26.0 || .567 || .379 || .690 || 5.9 || .8 || .7 || 1.2 || 9.7 || 13.8
|-
| style="text-align:left;"| 2019–20
| style="text-align:left;"| Khimki
| 21 || 1 || 20.2 || .593 || .438 || .743 || 4.4 || .8 || .6 || .6 || 8.5 || 11
|-
| style="text-align:left;"| 2020–21
| style="text-align:left;"| Olimpia Milano
| 11 || 1 || 10.3 || .591 || .250 || .500 || 3.1 || .0 || .3 || .2 || 2.8 || 3.7
|-
| style="text-align:left;"| 2021–22
| style="text-align:left;"| Panathinaikos
| 32 || 13 || 16.2 || .603 || .500 || .758 || 3.0 || .4 || .4 || .5 || 5.5 || 7
|- class="sortbottom"
| style="text-align:center;" colspan="2"| Career
| 91 || 40 || 19.2 || .585 || .408 || .712 || 4.2 || .5 || .5 || .7 || 7.1 || 9.6

Personal life
The son of Gwyn, he has one younger brother, Justin, and is married to Korrie. An accomplished artist, Evans had a sketch of CBS analyst Dan Bonner showcased on national television broadcast of the Hilltoppers’ second round battle with Gonzaga during the 2009 NCAA Tournament and some of his art was also displayed throughout the WKU athletic offices. He majored in interdisciplinary studies with a concentration in art.

References

External links

 Western Kentucky Hilltoppers bio 
 EuroLeague profile
 

1987 births
Living people
20th-century African-American people
21st-century African-American sportspeople
African-American basketball players
American expatriate basketball people in Greece
American expatriate basketball people in Russia
American expatriate basketball people in Turkey
American men's basketball players
Atlanta Hawks players
Basketball players from Arkansas
BC Khimki players
Centers (basketball)
Dallas Mavericks players
Darüşşafaka Basketbol players
Erie BayHawks (2017–2019) players
Olimpia Milano players
Panathinaikos B.C. players
Paris Basketball players
People from Crossett, Arkansas
Power forwards (basketball)
Texas Legends players
Utah Flash players
Utah Jazz draft picks
Utah Jazz players
Western Kentucky Hilltoppers basketball players